Mael Isa ua Máilgiric, Irish poet, died 1088.

Mael Isa ua Máilgiric who held the post of Chief Ollam of Ireland and died at Clonmacnoise in 1088. His obit is given in the Annals of the Four Masters as follows- "M1088.4 Maelisa Ua Maelgiric, chief poet and chief Ollamh, died."

External links
 http://www.ucc.ie/celt/published/T100001A/

Medieval Irish poets
11th-century Irish poets
11th-century Irish writers
1088 deaths
Year of birth unknown
Irish male poets